Sokratis Tsoukalas (born on 7 July 1992) is a Greek footballer who plays for Asteras Vlachioti as a right back.

Career

AEK Athens
In 2011, Sokratis Tsoukalas was signed by Greek side AEK Athens. He made his debut against SK Sturm Graz in the Europa League on 14 December 2011. Although AEK Athens was relegated to the 3rd Division in order the team's debt to be erased, Tsoukalas was agreed to stay and help AEK for the big comeback to Greek Superleague alongside Kostas Tsoupros, Anastasios Tsoumagas, Dimitris Anakoglou, Miguel Cordero, Dimitris Grontis and Michalis Pavlis. However, his contract was terminated on 3 July 2014.

Honours

Club
AEK Athens
Football League 2 (1): 2013–14 (6th Group)

References

External links
 
Myplayer.gr Profile
Onsports.gr Profile

1992 births
Living people
Palermo F.C. players
AEK Athens F.C. players
Apollon Smyrnis F.C. players
Fokikos A.C. players
Footballers from Athens
Greek footballers
Association football fullbacks